The Philippines competed at the 2020 Summer Olympics in Tokyo. Originally scheduled to take place from 24 July to 9 August 2020, the Games have been postponed to 23 July to 8 August 2021, because of the COVID-19 pandemic. Since the nation's official debut in 1924, Filipino athletes have appeared in every edition of the Summer Olympic Games, but did not attend the 1980 Summer Olympics in Moscow because of the nation's partial support for the US-led boycott.

The Philippine Olympic Committee fielded a team of 19 athletes, nine men and ten women, to compete in eleven different sports at the Games. Among the sports represented by the nation's athletes, the Philippines marked its Olympic debut in skateboarding (new to the 2020 Games), as well as its return to gymnastics and rowing.

The Philippines left Tokyo with its best Olympic performance since entering in 1924, bringing home four medals, its biggest medal haul ever, surpassing the three medals the country won at the 1932 Summer Olympics in Los Angeles. The first-ever gold medal for the Philippines was won by weightlifter Hidilyn Diaz.  The country also received its first silver medal by a female boxer courtesy of Nesthy Petecio, a bronze medal by Eumir Marcial, and a silver medal by Carlo Paalam, all of which competed in boxing.

Medalists

Background

Administration
Philippine Football Federation president Mariano Araneta was appointed in August 2019 as chef de mission of the Filipino delegation to the Games by Philippine Olympic Committee (POC) president Abraham Tolentino. Araneta was selected for his availability because his national sports association did not qualify a team for the Olympics. Araneta succeeded Joey Romasanta who was appointed as chef de mission for the same edition of the Olympics by Tolentino's predecessor, Ricky Vargas.

The Philippine Sports Commission, the Philippine government's sports agency, provided  for the country's participation in the Olympics.

The Philippines also sent five technical officials to the 2020 Summer Olympics namely Karla Cabrera (archery), Marilee Estampador (fencing), Len Escollante (canoe), Jercyl Lerin (rowing) and Ferdinand Pascual (basketball).

Qualification
The Philippines was targeting to qualify around 38 athletes for the Olympics but only 19 athletes ultimately qualified. The Philippines made failed attempts to qualify athletes in archery, basketball (including 3x3), cycling, fencing, karate, surfing, and windsurfing. The country also intended to qualify athletes in canoeing, but they had to withdraw their athletes from the Asian qualifiers due to a positive COVID-19 result.

Opening and closing ceremonies
For the opening ceremony, it was announced on 7 July 2021 that pole vaulter EJ Obiena and judoka Kiyomi Watanabe would be the flagbearers of the Philippines. However, Obiena was dropped as one of the flagbearers, after a new protocol was introduced which required flagbearers to be in Tokyo 48 hours prior to the opening ceremony. Obiena was set to arrive on 23 July, the date when the opening ceremony was scheduled to be held. Boxer Eumir Marcial was announced to be Obiena's replacement. In the Parade of Nations, the Philippine delegation was represented by six officials and two athletes. The officials wore ready-to-wear barong from the Filipino clothing company Kultura, topped off by a shawl made by Filipino fashion designer Rajo Laurel while the two athletes who served as flagbearers wore the tracksuits supplied by Asics.

Boxer Nesthy Petecio was named as flagbearer for the closing ceremony.

Impact of the COVID-19 pandemic

The preparation of the delegation was largely affected by travel restrictions imposed as a response to the COVID-19 pandemic. In relation, Filipino businessman Enrique Razon has pledged to procure COVID-19 vaccines for the Philippine delegation from Moderna. Some athletes who had training outside the Philippines were vaccinated in their host countries.

The 2020 Summer Olympics scheduled for July to August 2021 pushed through despite the prevailing pandemic. Some athletes set to compete in the games and officials have tested positive for COVID-19. The Philippine delegation was also affected by the disease with at least two officials contracted COVID-19. No Filipino athlete has tested positive for COVID-19 during the duration of the games.

A sports official was unable to join the delegation after testing positive for COVID-19 when they were still in Manila. Another member of Team Philippines, a foreign coach who arrived in Tokyo was suspected to have contracted COVID-19 after routine testing yielded false positive and negative results. The coach at one point experienced fever was isolated from the rest of the delegation. The individual's contacts has tested negative for COVID-19 and if the coach themselves tested negative they would still be obliged to leave Japan.

Rower Cris Nievarez was a close contact of a COVID-19 case which caused uncertainty whether he would be able to compete. Nievarez was able to take part in his event.

Broadcasters

Competitors 
The Philippines managed to qualify 19 athletes competing in 12 sports for the 2020 Summer Olympics, making the delegation the largest since the 2000 Summer Olympics where the country fielded 20 athletes. For the first time, there are more women (10 athletes) than men (9 athletes) competing for the country in the Olympics. The average age of the Philippines' athletes is at 25 years; the oldest member being Juvic Pagunsan (43 years old) and the youngest being Yuka Saso (20 years old). All athletes except for Hidilyn Diaz (who has made four consecutive appearances since the 2008 Summer Olympics) are first time competitors in the games.

The following is the list of number of competitors in the Games.

Athletics

Filipino athletes further achieved the entry standards, either by qualifying time or by world ranking, in the following track and field events (up to a maximum of 3 athletes in each event):

Pole vaulter EJ Obiena, who was the first athlete of the Philippines to qualify for the Olympics in 2019, underwent training with Ukrainian coach Vitaly Petrov. Kristina Marie Knott, who trained under Rohsaan Griffin and was set to compete in the women's 200 m, participated in 100 m races due to the lack of 200 m competitions due to the COVID-19 pandemic.

Obiena and Knott were due to move to the Athletes Village for their stay in Tokyo, but the Philippine Athletics Track and Field Association (PATAFA) decided against this due to a coach in the village testing positive for COVID-19. PATAFA decided for the athletes to remain in a nearby hotel and hired the service of a private vehicle for transport of its athletes to and from the training venue.

Obiena who had a personal best of 5.91 meters in the men's pole vault, cleared 5.75 meters to qualify for the final. He took two failed prior attempts to clear said height. Obiena fell out of contention for a medal, after he failed to clear 5.80 meters, placing him in eleventh.

Knott finished last among five runners which recorded a time in the women's 200 m. Experiencing heat exhaustion she was immediately rushed to a nearby medical station after she finished her race. She finished thirty-seventh overall among the 41 runners in the heats.

Track & road events

Field events

Boxing 

The Philippines entered four boxers (two per gender) into the Olympic tournament. 2019 world silver medalist Eumir Marcial (men's middleweight) and 2019 Southeast Asian Games runner-up Irish Magno (women's flyweight) secured places in their respective weight divisions, with the former advancing to the semifinals and the latter scoring a box-off triumph, at the 2020 Asia & Oceania Qualification Tournament in Amman, Jordan. Reigning world champion Nesthy Petecio (women's featherweight) and Carlo Paalam (men's flyweight) completed the nation's boxing lineup by topping the list of eligible boxers from Asia and Oceania in their respective weight divisions of the IOC's Boxing Task Force Rankings after the World Olympic Boxing Qualifier tournament due to be held in Paris, France was cancelled.

Preparation of the boxing delegation was affected by the quarantine measures imposed in the Philippines in response to the COVID-19 pandemic with some boxers reportedly gaining extra  of weight due to relative idleness of boxers stranded in their homes. Eumir Marcial prepared for the Olympics in the United States, while the three other qualified boxers were sent to a training camp in Thailand. The boxing team trained with Australian consultant coach Don Abnett.

The draw which determined the Filipino boxers' opponent was held on 22 July 2021.

Three out of four boxers are guaranteed a medal. Irish Magno lost to Jutamas Jitpong in the round of 16 eliminating her from contention for a podium finish. She has previously defeated Jitpong in the 2019 Southeast Asian Games semifinals. Nesthy Petecio progressed all the way through the gold medal match but lost to Japanese boxer Sena Irie. Petecio became the first female Olympic medalist in boxing for the Philippines. Carlo Paalam and Eumir Marcial are guaranteed a medal, since they managed to advance to the semifinals in their events.

Golf

The Philippines entered three golfers (one male and two female) into the Olympic tournament. Juvic Pagunsan (world no. 216), Yuka Saso (world no. 8), and Bianca Pagdanganan (world no. 165) qualified directly among the top 60 eligible players for their respective events based on the IGF World Rankings.

Gymnastics

Artistic
The Philippines entered one artistic gymnast into the Olympic competition for the first time since 1968 which featured Ernesto Beren and Norman Henson. Nineteen-year-old Carlos Yulo booked a spot in the men's individual all-around and apparatus events by topping the list of twelve gymnasts eligible for qualification at the 2019 World Championships in Stuttgart, Germany. Yulo is the first Filipino born in the 2000s to qualify for the Summer Olympics.

Yulo, after competing at the 2019 Southeast Asian Games in the Philippines, went on to Japan to prepare for the Olympics. However, he had an eight-month hiatus, with his next competition after the SEA Games being the All-Japan Senior Gymnastics Championships held in September 2020. He was considered as a strong contender to win the country's first gold medal in the floor exercise, his signature event.

Yulo qualified for the vault finals. He failed to do the same for the other apparatuses, including the floor exercise. In the floor exercise he failed to execute a landing in the early part of his routine. His second landing was self-described as "not good either". Yulo insisted that he was not affected by pressure or nervousness during his floor exercise performance and dismissed reports that he was nursing an injury, which he said he had sustained over three months ago. Yulo's coach Munehiro Kugiyama took responsibility for Yulo's failure to advance to the floor exercise finals.

Yulo did not expect to qualify for the vault finals, admitting he was surprised with his performance in that apparatus' qualifiers. He has tempered expectations that he would medal in vault but has pledged to improve his previous score. Yulo finished fourth in the vault finals. Yulo incurred a penalty in his first vault when he missed his footing and had a misstep narrowly costing him a podium finish.

Men

Judo

The Philippines qualified one judoka for the women's half-middleweight category (63 kg) at the Games. Kiyomi Watanabe accepted a continental berth from the Asian zone as the nation's top-ranked judoka outside of direct qualifying position in the IJF World Ranking List of 28 June 2021.

Kiyomi Watanabe faced Cristina Cabaña of Spain in the Round of 32. Watanabe went for an attack on Cabaña but momentarily lost balance. This prompted Cabaña to take advantage of the situation, executing a sumi otoshi or corner throw on Watanabe. The throw was deemed to have resulted to an ippon ending the match in less than a minute. The match could have been continued since the throw was initially judged as a waza-ari, but the referee upgraded the decision to an ippon.

Rowing

For the first time since 2000, the Philippines qualified one boat in the men's single sculls for the Games through Cris Nievarez's third-place finish in the B-final and securing the fourth of five berths available at the 2021 FISA Asia & Oceania Olympic Qualification Regatta in Tokyo, Japan.

Nievarez is set to compete in the men's single sculls event to be contested at the Sea Forest Waterway, the same venue where he secured an Olympic berth for his country.

Nievarez was the first athlete from the Philippine delegation to compete in the 2020 Summer Olympics. Ahead of the opening ceremony on 23 July, Nievarez clocked 7:22.97 in Heat 5 of the men's single sculls event, qualifying for the quarterfinals. In the heat, he finished behind Damir Martin of Croatia (7:09.17) and Alexander Vyazovkin of the ROC team (7:14.95). Nievarez, ended his bid for an Olympic medal after he placed fifth among rowers. He advanced to the semifinal C/D to determine his final placing. He finished 23rd overall out of 32 rowers after competing in the classification final D.

According to Philippine Rowing Association president, Patrick Gregorio, Nievarez's performance was "beyond expectations". Nievarez was the first rower representing the Philippines to advance to the quarterfinals.

Qualification Legend: FA=Final A (medal); FB=Final B (non-medal); FC=Final C (non-medal); FD=Final D (non-medal); FE=Final E (non-medal); FF=Final F (non-medal); SA/B=Semifinals A/B; SC/D=Semifinals C/D; SE/F=Semifinals E/F; QF=Quarterfinals; R=Repechage

Shooting

The Philippines granted an invitation from ISSF to send Jayson Valdez in the men's rifle shooting to the Olympics, as long as the minimum qualifying score (MQS) was fulfilled by 6 June 2021, marking the nation's return to the sport for the first time since London 2012. Valdez competing in the men's 10 m air rifle failed to advance to that event's final. He scored 612.6 in the qualification round, placing him as the 44th best shooter among 47 competitors.

Skateboarding

The Philippines entered one skateboarder into the Olympic tournament. Asian Games champion Margielyn Didal was automatically selected among the top 16 eligible skateboarders in the women's street based on the World Skate Olympic Rankings of 30 June 2021.

Competing in the women's street event, Didal advanced to the finals after finishing with 12.02 points. In the final, Didal finished in 7th place, having a total score of 7.52. Didal was only able to land her second trick (out of five) and reportedly had an ankle sprain. After her participation, Didal bared that she competed with an ankle injury which she sustained on her last day of training when she was still in Los Angeles.

Swimming

The Philippines received a universality invitation from FINA to send two top-ranked swimmers (one per gender) in their respective individual events to the Olympics, based on the FINA Points System of 20 June 2021. Luke Gebbie and Remedy Rule qualified by satisfying the Olympic Standard Time for their respective individual events. Gebbie is the Philippine national recordholder in the men's 100m freestyle while Rule is the Philippine national recordholder in the women's 100m butterfly.

Rule failed to progress to the semifinals of the women's 100 m butterfly. She however advanced to the semifinals of the 200 m butterfly since there were only 16 competing swimmers (with the top 16 in the heats qualifying to the semifinals). She failed to advance to the 200 m butterfly finals after placing fifteenth.

Gebbie likewise failed to advance to the semifinals of both events he competed in. While he finished first during his heat in the men's 50 m freestyle with a time of 22.84 seconds, he ultimately placed 41st of 73 participants. In the men's 100 m freestyle he clocked a time of 49.64 seconds, breaking both his personal record and the Philippine national record of 49.94 seconds, which he set during the 2019 FINA World Championships,

Taekwondo

The Philippines entered one athlete into the taekwondo competition at the Games. Kurt Barbosa secured a spot in the men's flyweight category (58 kg) with a top two finish at the 2021 Asian Qualification Tournament in Amman, Jordan.

Barbosa was drawn to face top-ranked South Korean athlete Jang Jun, who also won gold in the 2019 World Taekwondo Championships, in the Round of 16. Barbosa lost to Jang, but he could have still played in the repechage to potentially clinch a bronze medal if the South Korean reached the final. However Jang lost to Mohamed Khalil Jendoubi of Tunisia, which ended Barbosa's Olympic campaign.

Weightlifting 

The Philippines entered two weightlifters into the Olympic competition. Rio 2016 silver medalist Hidilyn Diaz finished second of the eight highest-ranked weightlifters in the women's 55 kg category based on the IWF Absolute World Rankings, with rookie Elreen Ando topping the field of weightlifters from the Asian zone in the women's 64 kg category based on the IWF Absolute Continental Rankings.

Diaz is supported by Jeaneth Aro (sports nutritionist), Karen Trinidad (sports psychologist), Gao Kaiwen (head coach; from China), and Julius Naranjo (strength and conditioning mentor).

She has been separated from her family since December 2019. In February 2020, Diaz went to Malaysia as part of her preparations for the Olympic Games as per advise of coach Gao. However she was left stranded in the country due to COVID-19 pandemic-related travel restrictions. Her training in Malaysia was also disrupted by the movement control order imposed in the country which affected the availability of gyms.

Diaz, competing in the women's −55 kg, won the first-ever gold medal for the Philippines. She lifted 97 kg in the snatch and 127 kg in the clean and jerk for a total of 224 kg; bettering Liao Qiuyun of China by a single kilo. Her score in the clean and jerk and her overall total score established new Olympic records. It was also the first time Diaz was ever to perform a 127 kg lift in the clean and jerk, only able to successfully lift 125 kg while she was training.

Diaz is the first Filipino competitor to win two consecutive Olympic medals since Teófilo Yldefonso in 1928 and 1932.

Elreen Ando on her part finished 7th on her event, but managed to set new Philippine national records in the snatch, clean and jerk, and total in her weight class.

See also
Philippines at the 2020 Summer Paralympics

External links
Team Philippines  – 2020 Summer Olympics NOC Profile

References

Olympics
Nations at the 2020 Summer Olympics
2020